Arnaldo Salvi (November 21, 1915–2002) was an Italian professional football player.

1915 births
2002 deaths
Italian footballers
Serie A players
Atalanta B.C. players
Inter Milan players
U.S. Cremonese players
Calcio Lecco 1912 players
Brescia Calcio players
Association football midfielders